Garhi Mahan Singh (also spelled Garhi Maha Singh or Garhi Mahan Singh) is a medium size village in Phillaur tehsil of Jalandhar District of Punjab State, India. It is located 3.1 km away from postal head office Apra. The village is 16.4 km away from Phillaur, 43.5 km from Jalandhar, and 119 km from state capital Chandigarh. The village is administrated by a sarpanch who is an elected representative of village as per Panchayati raj (India).

Caste 
The village has population of 1231 and in the village most of the villagers are from schedule caste (SC) which has constitutes 44.03% of total population of the village and it doesn't have any Schedule Tribe (ST) population.

Transport

Rail 
The nearest train station is situated 12.7 km away in Goraya and Ludhiana Jn Railway Station is 30.9 km away from the village.

Air 
The nearest domestic airport is 48 km away in Ludhiana and the nearest international airport is 138 km away in Amritsar other nearest international airport is located in Chandigarh.

References 

Villages in Jalandhar district
Villages in Phillaur tehsil